Michael Sean McCary (born December 16, 1971) is an American singer, known for being a former bass singer of the R&B group Boyz II Men (in which he was sometimes known as Mike Bass).

In 2003, McCary left Boyz II Men due to back spasms that were eventually diagnosed as multiple sclerosis. He was shown in the pilot for a talk show with Paula Poundstone called A Pound of Paula, which wasn't picked up.

References

External links 
 
 [ Michael McCary] at Allmusic

1971 births
Living people
Boyz II Men members
American basses
Musicians from Philadelphia
American soul musicians
Singers from Pennsylvania
American contemporary R&B singers
20th-century African-American male singers
21st-century African-American male singers